Alun Tan Lan (born Alun Evans) is a Welsh singer-songwriter from the village of Pandy Tudur (nr Abergele).

He sings exclusively through the medium of the Welsh language.

When Alun was 14 he formed the punk rock band Dail Te Pawb, He later went on to join Boff Frank Bough playing bass. He used the pseudonym Alun Evansh in those days (c1990) and also produced a cut 'n' paste punk style fanzine called 'Brwas'

His first album Aderyn Papur was co-produced by Toni Schiavone and Mark Roberts, formerly of Y Cyrff and Catatonia, and was released in 2004 after he returned from living and performing in Ireland.

Alun opened for Gruff Rhys on his 2005 solo tour and is a long-standing member of Rhys's live band. He has also contributed to solo albums by Gorky's Zygotic Mynci front-man Euros Childs and was part of his touring band.

Under his original name Alun Evans, he is also the guitarist for instrumental surf-rock band Y Niwl.

Awards
In 2005 Alun received the BBC Radio Cymru awards for Best Male Artist and Best Composer.

Solo discography
Aderyn Papur, Rasal, 2004
Y Distawrwydd, Rasal, 2005
Yr Aflonydd, Aderyn Papur, 2007
Cymlau, double album released on soundcloud.com, 2012

References

External links
Official website
Myspace profile

Year of birth missing (living people)
Living people
Welsh guitarists
Welsh male singers
Welsh singer-songwriters
Welsh songwriters
Welsh-speaking musicians
Place of birth missing (living people)
British male songwriters
British male singer-songwriters